Henri Theodore Young (born June 20, 1911 – disappeared 1972) was an American convicted bank robber and murderer who, while serving one of a series of prison terms, attempted a 1939 escape from Alcatraz Federal Penitentiary with four other inmates. During the escape attempt two inmates were shot, and one died of his wounds. All survivors were quickly recaptured. Two of the men, Young and Rufus McCain, were sentenced to solitary confinement and served the terms at Alcatraz for a period of three years (until autumn of 1942). Eleven days after re-entering the Alcatraz general prison population in 1942, Young murdered fellow escapee McCain. 

No apparent motive was ever disclosed for this crime. Young's defense put Alcatraz and the penal system on trial, leading to questions about how the prison was run. In 1948, Young was transferred from Alcatraz to the Medical Center for Federal Prisoners, Springfield, Missouri. Upon completion of his federal sentence, he was later transferred to Washington State Penitentiary at Walla Walla to begin a life sentence for a 1933 murder conviction.

After release from Walla Walla, Young "jumped parole" in 1972 and his whereabouts were reported as "unknown". Young was portrayed as a fictional character of the same name in the film Murder in the First (1995), in which he was played by actor Kevin Bacon. Henri Young is the subject of the song "Behind the Eyes of Henri Young", featured on the album Dragonfly (2017), by Australian singer Kasey Chambers.

Life
Young was born in Kansas City, Missouri on June 20, 1911. Beginning a life of crime, he became a bank robber and was known for aggressively taking hostages. 

In 1933, Young was convicted of murder in Washington state. After serving time in prisons in Washington and Montana for other crimes, he was sent to the federal prison on Alcatraz Island. On the night of January 13, 1939, Young, with prisoners Rufus McCain, Arthur Barker, Dale Stamphill, and William Martin, attempted to escape. Martin, Young, and McCain surrendered, while Barker and Stamphill refused to surrender and were subsequently shot. Barker eventually died from his injuries.

At his trial for McCain's murder in 1942, Young and his attorney argued that the harsh system at Alcatraz had brutalized and dehumanized him. According to the San Francisco Examiner, 
"Emphasis which [the defense] repeatedly laid on the fact that Young was in isolation or solitary confinement for more than three years—and that he drove his knife into McCain's abdomen just eleven days after release from such confinement, made it clear that the defense hopes to show not only that Young was 'punch drunk' but that the punches were administered by the Alcatraz 'system'." 

Describing conditions in solitary confinement, Young said:

In 1954, Young was transferred to the Washington State Penitentiary at Walla Walla to begin a life sentence for the 1933 murder conviction. He was released from Washington State Penitentiary in 1972, at age 61. He "jumped parole and, according to Washington State authorities, his whereabouts are unknown." No further records exist on Young.

Issues with film
The film Murder in the First (1995) has a number of inaccuracies compared to the facts of Young's life. It mistakenly presents Young as being arrested for stealing $5 in order to feed himself and his younger sister. It shows that he was tortured by officials after his escape attempt. It shows him killing McCain in the cafeteria immediately after his return to the general population, rather than later. It also showed that he was found dead in his prison cell in 1942, just before his appeal, with the word "victory" on the wall. 

As noted above, Young had a prior murder conviction before arriving at Alcatraz. He was transferred from Alcatraz to serve the remainder of that murder sentence later in life at a Washington state prison. He disappeared after jumping parole after being released in 1972 from Walla Walla.

See also
List of fugitives from justice who disappeared

References

External links
United States Penitentiary Conduct Report
San Francisco History, Henri Young – Alcatraz Killing , San Francisco Genealogy

1911 births
Year of death unknown
American escapees
Escapees from United States federal government detention
Inmates of Alcatraz Federal Penitentiary
People from Montana
American people convicted of manslaughter
American people convicted of robbery
American people convicted of murder